Protein misato homolog 1 is a protein that in humans is encoded by the MSTO1 gene.

The MSTO1 gene is 5134 base pairs (located in chromosome 1) and the MSTO1 protein is 570 aminoacids in length. It is located in the outer membrane of the mitochondrion, and is involved in the regulation of mitochondrial distribution and morphology.

Structure 

The misato protein contains an N-terminal misato segment II myosin-like domain and a central tubulin domain.

References

Further reading